Doora Church, also known as St Brecan, Doora, is a ruined church in the civil parish of Doora, County Clare, Ireland. It may date back to 500 AD, although it has been extensively reworked since then.

History
The church may have been founded by Saint Brecan around 500 AD.
If Brecan was the founder, as tradition states, it would have been one of the first central mission churches in Clare.
It is mentioned in 1189.
At this time the church, which is near Kilbrecan, was called Durinierekin.
The church itself lies in the townland of Bunnow.

Description

O'Donovan and Curry 1839

According to John O'Donovan and Eugene O'Curry, writing in 1839:

Westropp 1900

Writing in 1900 the antiquarian Thomas Johnson Westropp described the church as follows:

Recent times

A website maintained by King's College London recorded in 2015 that the church had changed little since it was described by Westropp, apart from the fact that the arch stone of the west window of the south wall had fallen to the ground to the south of the church. The sculpture was so badly worn that it could not be dated, but the moldings of the windows seemed to date to the 12th century.
The south door had been repaired with a concrete gable.

References

Sources

Church ruins in Ireland
Churches in County Clare
Former churches in the Republic of Ireland